Negra consentida is a Venezuelan telenovela created by Valentina Párraga and produced by Radio Caracas Television in 2004. Ligia Petit and Pedro Rendón star as the protagonists.

Plot
Barbarita is a young mestiza filled with beauty, a mixture of color and a passion for drums. However, she does not know her true origin as the daughter of a black woman from Barlovento, a small coastal town in Venezuela and a white Portuguese man. Barbarita is forced to flee from her hometown after being accused of a crime she didn't commit. To save herself, she poses as  another woman and thus comes into the household of the Aristiguieta's, a family full of intrigue which is offended by Barbarita due to the color of her skin.

In the journey imposed by destiny, Barbarita meets with Miguel, a successful businessman who lives for work and whose maximum ambition is to govern the supermarket industry. He falls for Barnarita's charm and passion that resembles a hurricane. Problems arise when the husband of the woman Barbarita is impersonating discovers the lie. In addition, Barbarita will be the target of jealousy, envy and resentment caused by the unexpected inheritance that will receive from the Nascimento family, her true relatives.  A great love story arises, between two worlds of different colors and flavors, which are intermixed in a rich aroma of coffee with milk.

Cast

Ligia Petit as Bárbara "Barbarita" Blanco Guaramato
Pedro Rendón as Miguel Ángel Aristiguieta Marthan
Caridad Canelón as Trinidad Guaramato de Blanco
Eileen Abad as Isadora Russian
Miriam Ochoa as Emma Marthan de Aristiguieta
Jean Carlo Simancas as Caetano Nascimento
Ámbar Díaz as Estela Aristiguieta Marthan
Chantal Baudaux as Viviana Altúnez Meaño
Alicia Plaza as Herminia Meaño de Nascimento
Juan Carlos Tarazona as Rolando
Wilmer Machado "Coquito" as Froilán Malpica
María de Lourdes Devonish as Doña Bárbara Guaramato "La Abuela"
Daniel Elbittar as Raimundo Aristiguieta Marthan
Marcos Moreno as Juan de Dios Blanco
Jenny Noguera as Antonia Blanco "Toña La Negra"
María Cristina Lozada as Doña Bernarda Palacios de Aristiguieta
Trina Medina as Felicidad Martínez
Abelardo Behna as Wilfredo Meléndez
Natalia Ramírez as Isabel Vélez
Priscila Izquierdo as Valentina Aristiguieta Russian
Numa Delgado as Aníbal Altúnez Meaño
Brenda Hanst as Tibisay María Blanco Guaramato
Pastor Oviedo as Clímaco Blanco Guaramato
Glennys Colina as Celina
Alexander Fernández as Gregory BlancoLuis Fernández as Rodolfo AristiguietaCésar Román as Omar AbdulDaniela Navarro as JessicaGiancarlo Pasqualotto as Arturo LiscanoMónica Pasqualotto as Moraima FerrerFlavio León as Jhon JairoCarlos Olivier as Efrén MeléndezAbril Schreiber as Ella mismaJoel Borges as Él mismoCésar Suárez as Sheik Shamir''

References

External links

Venezuelan telenovelas
2004 telenovelas
RCTV telenovelas
2004 Venezuelan television series debuts
2005 Venezuelan television series endings
Spanish-language telenovelas
Television shows set in Caracas